Sarıyer Belediyesi Spor Kulübü is the women's volleyball club based in Istanbul, Turkey.

History

2012
After two undefeated seasons, claiming the championship from the League 3 and League 2, Sariyer climbed to the Turkish First League.

Sarıyer won the First Bosphorus International Tournament, played in their home court as a pre-season tournament in late September, defeating the German team Alemannia Aachen.
 Emel Çelikpazı was awarded best server.

Current squad
Squad as of season 2021–22

Technical and managerial staff
Technical Team as of season 2020–21

Honours

Turkish championships (2)

 Turkish Women's Volleyball League 2:
  Winners 2011–12
 Turkish Women's Volleyball League 3:
  Winners 2010–11

Notable players

Domestic Players

 Cansu Çetin
 Ezgi Dilik
 Gözde Yılmaz
 Seray Altay
 Damla Çakıroğlu
 Melis Durul
 Beyza Arıcı
 Arelya Karasoy
 Hande Baladın
 Hazal Selin Arifoğlu
 Zülfiye Gündoğdu
 Özgenur Yurtdagülen
 Funda Bilgi
 Esra Gümüş
 Merve Tanıl
 Ecem Alici
 Büşra Kılıçlı
 Lila Sengün

European Players

 Katerina Zhidkova
 Nikalina Bashnakova

 Dominika Strumilo

 Dajana Bošković

 Eva Yaneva

 Mira Topić

 Kimberly Drewniok

 Tijana Malešević
 Ivana Djerisilo
 Aleksandra Crnčević

 Alica Székelyová

Non-European Players

 Brackcides Khadambi

 Raquel Silva

 Yaima Ortiz
 Yusidey Silié

 Prisilla Rivera

 Áurea Cruz

 Alexis Crimes
 Nicole Fawcett
 Regan Hood Scott
 Madison Rigdon
 Naya Crittenden

 Ajcharaporn Kongyot
 Chatchu-On Moksri

Players written in italic still play for the club.

See also
 See also Turkey women's national volleyball team

References

External links

 Turkish Volleyball Federation 

Women's volleyball teams in Turkey
Sport in Sarıyer